Baltinava Municipality is a former municipality in Latgale, Latvia. The municipality was formed in 2009 by reorganization of Baltinava parish the administrative centre being Baltinava. The municipality was located in the northeast of the country and bordered with Viļaka municipality in the north, Pytalovsky District of Pskov Oblast of Russia in the east, Kārsava municipality in the south, and Balvi municipality in the west.

On 1 July 2021, Baltinava Municipality ceased to exist and its territory was merged into Balvi Municipality.

See also 
 Administrative divisions of Latvia (2009)

References 

 
Former municipalities of Latvia